Chondroitinsulfatase may refer to:
 N-acetylgalactosamine-4-sulfatase, an enzyme
 N-acetylglucosamine-6-sulfatase, an enzyme